Socorro (English: Succour) is a former parish (freguesia) in the municipality of Lisbon, Portugal. The local area is also designated as Martim Moniz. At the administrative reorganization of Lisbon on 8 December 2012 it became part of the parish Santa Maria Maior.

Main sites
Menino de Deus Church

References 

Former parishes of Lisbon